Leptocyrtinus albosetosus is a species of beetle in the family Cerambycidae. It was described by Stephan von Breuning in 1943. It is known from Tonga.

References

Cyrtinini
Beetles described in 1943